Wayne Leon Graham (born April 6, 1936) is the former head coach of the Rice Owls baseball team in Houston, Texas. He has coached one College World Series championship team and five NJCAA World Series championship teams. Also a former professional baseball player, Graham played in Major League Baseball (MLB) for the Philadelphia Phillies and New York Mets.

Early life
Graham was born in Yoakum, Texas. His father, Earl moved the family to Houston to get a job. Wayne was the batboy for the 1945 semi-pro Finger Furniture baseball team coached by his father.

Playing career
Graham attended Reagan High School in Houston and played college baseball at the University of Texas, where he played two seasons under coach Bibb Falk.

Graham was signed by the Phillies as an amateur free agent in 1957. He played eleven years in pro ball, with the Phillies and Mets organizations. Graham was named Texas minor league player of the year in 1962 after hitting .311 for the Dallas-Fort Worth Rangers.

Graham received two brief MLB call-ups in the early 1960s. In , he was recalled by the Phillies, playing in ten games for manager Gene Mauch. Graham then appeared in twenty games for the 1964 New York Mets under the tutelage of legendary skipper Casey Stengel. He batted .127 in 55 at-bats in his brief major league career.

Coaching career

High school
When his playing career ended, Graham returned to the University of Texas to earn a Bachelor of Science degree in physical education in 1970, and he later added a master's degree in education at the University of Houston in 1973.

His coaching career began at Scarborough High School in Houston. Graham coached for nine seasons at Scarborough and one year at Spring Branch High School before moving on to coach junior college baseball at San Jacinto College in Houston.

San Jacinto
Beginning in 1981, Graham turned San Jacinto into the nation's most dominant JUCO baseball team. After regular conference titles in Graham's first few seasons, the Gators became a dominant force in 1984 when they began a run of seven consecutive 50-win seasons and berths in the NJCAA World Series in Grand Junction, Colorado.

After losing in the 1984 championship game, San Jacinto won three consecutive titles from 1985–87. After falling short again in 1988, the Gators went back-to-back in 1989–90. Those five national titles in six years eventually led to Graham being named Junior College Coach of the Century by Collegiate Baseball.

In his 11 seasons at San Jacinto, Graham posted a 675–113 record (.857 win percentage), earned five national coach of the year awards, and produced countless professional players, most notably Roger Clemens and Andy Pettitte.

Rice
Graham took over at Rice in 1992. He inherited a program that had tallied only seven winning seasons in 78 years of Southwest Conference play and had only finished above fourth place once. As at San Jacinto, he turned the program into a national powerhouse. A program that had never before qualified for the NCAA Division I baseball tournament made 23 consecutive tournament appearances (1995–2017) and won 20 consecutive regular-season or tournament conference championships (1996–2015) in three different conferences (Southwest Conference, Western Athletic Conference, and Conference USA). Rice has also been to the College World Series seven times (1997, 1999, 2002, 2003, 2006, 2007, and 2008). Graham's crowning achievement was the 2003 College World Series, in which Rice won its first national championship in any sport in its 91-year history. Not one to rest on his laurels, Graham quipped during a post-game interview, "We want to do it again." On April 16, 2016, Graham won his 1,100th Division I game (3-2 over Western Kentucky).  He has more than 1,600 wins as a collegiate head coach. Graham was also largely responsible for Rice's on-campus baseball stadium, Reckling Park, being built in 2000.

In 2004, Graham once again presided over history, as three Rice pitchers were drafted in the first eight picks of the 2004 Major League Baseball Draft, the only time three teammates have ever been selected in the first round. Graham's Rice teams have produced first-round picks Jose Cruz, Jr. (1995), Matt Anderson (1997), Lance Berkman (1997), Bubba Crosby (1998), Kenny Baugh (2001), Jon Skaggs (2001), David Aardsma (2003), Philip Humber (2004), Jeff Niemann (2004), Wade Townsend (2004, 2005), Joe Savery (2007), and Anthony Rendon (2011). Eight of those players have been pitchers, and Graham is known for developing players that went undrafted out of high school, such as Niemann and Townsend.

During the 2017 season, despite finishing in 6th place in Conference USA, Graham led Rice to their 23rd consecutive NCAA Tournament. Needing to win the Conference USA tournament title to qualify for the NCAA tournament and to keep the streak alive, he led to Owls to the conference title. Rice won four consecutive games and rallied late in the championship to upset #11 nationally ranked Southern Miss 5–4 on a walk-off double. Graham never had a losing season as a high school or college coach until his final season at Rice, 2018. His contract was not extended after that season.

Head coaching record

See also

List of current NCAA Division I baseball coaches

References

External links

Wayne Graham at SABR (Baseball BioProject)
Wayne Graham at Baseball Almanac
Wayne Graham at Ultimate Mets Database
 Graham, Wayne and David Goldstein. Wayne Graham Oral History, Houston Oral History Project, August 25, 2009.

1936 births
Living people
People from Yoakum, Texas
Baseball players from Houston
Rice Owls baseball coaches
Texas Longhorns baseball players
University of Houston alumni
Philadelphia Phillies players
New York Mets players
San Diego Padres (minor league) players
Chattanooga Lookouts players
Arkansas Travelers players
Dallas Rangers players
Des Moines Demons players
High Point-Thomasville Hi-Toms players
Syracuse Chiefs players
Buffalo Bisons (minor league) players
Dallas–Fort Worth Spurs players
Tokyo Orions players
Major League Baseball third basemen
National College Baseball Hall of Fame inductees
San Jacinto Central Ravens baseball coaches
High school baseball coaches in the United States